The Instituto de Antropología e Historia (IDAEH, Institute of Anthropology and History) is the national institute in Guatemala responsible for the protection and maintenance of Guatemala's historical and archaeological sites, monuments, artefacts, and other aspects of the nation's cultural heritage.

IDAEH was established by governmental decree in 1946. It is currently part of the Ministry of Culture and Sports.

References

Notes
 

Mesoamerican studies
Science and technology in Guatemala
Government agencies of Guatemala
1946 establishments in Guatemala
Research institutes in Guatemala